Dadri is a town and a municipal board in Gautam Buddha Nagar District in the state of Uttar Pradesh, India. Dadri Railway Station is a complex yard in North Central Railway spread over six kilometers on busiest route of Delhi–Kanpur–Patna–Howrah section of Indian Railways and also having connectivity with National Thermal Power Corporation (NTPC Dadri thermal power plant) and Container Depot.

Dadri is founded by Bhatti Gujjars and Gaur Brahmin 300 years ago

History 
It has an average elevation of 216 metres (709 ft).

Wetlands
Large swathes of Dadri have been classified as a wetland and is home to Blackbuck and Nilgai. It is also home to a significant population of migratory birds coming from as far as Siberia and Europe.

Demographics

 India census, Dadri had a population of 57,457. Males constitute 54% of the population and females 46%. Dadri hahs an average literacy rate of 74%, higher than the national average of 59.5%: male literacy is 80% and, female literacy is 68%. In Dadri, 18% of the population is under 5 years of age.

Politics
Dadri (Uttar Pradesh Assembly constituency) represents the area.

Educational Institutions 

 Shiv Nadar University

See also
 2015 Dadri mob lynching
 Gautam Buddha Nagar District

References

External links
Uttar Pradesh Assembly Elections
Dadri Assembly Elections

Cities and towns in Gautam Buddh Nagar district
Dadri